Jayson Jablonsky (born July 23, 1985) is an American male volleyball player. He is part of the United States men's national volleyball team.

References

External links
 profile at FIVB.org
 profile at teamusa.org
 profile at worldofvolley.com
 club career at greekvolley.gr

1985 births
Living people
American men's volleyball players
UC Irvine Anteaters men's volleyball players
Olympiacos S.C. players
PAOK V.C. players
People from Orange, California
People from Yorba Linda, California